Mohamed Allek ‎; (17 August 1974 – 8 March 2016) was a Paralympian athlete from Algeria, competing mainly in category T37 sprint events. He was born in Agouni Gueghrane.

In the 1996 Summer Paralympics Allek won gold medals in the T37 100 m and 200 m but missed out on a medal in the 400 m.  Four years later in Sydney he made amends and won a clean sweep of the T37 sprint gold medals.  In 2004 he was only able to compete in the 200 m and only won a bronze.  In Beijing in 2008 he competed in the 100 m, 200 m and as part of the Algerian 4 × 100 m squad but failed to win any medals for the first time.

Allek died in Algiers on the night of 7–8 March 2016, at the age of 41.

References

1974 births
2016 deaths
Algerian male sprinters
Athletes (track and field) at the 1996 Summer Paralympics
Athletes (track and field) at the 2000 Summer Paralympics
Athletes (track and field) at the 2004 Summer Paralympics
Athletes (track and field) at the 2008 Summer Paralympics
Paralympic athletes of Algeria
Paralympic medalists in athletics (track and field)
Medalists at the 1996 Summer Paralympics
Medalists at the 2000 Summer Paralympics
Medalists at the 2004 Summer Paralympics
Paralympic gold medalists for Algeria
Paralympic bronze medalists for Algeria
People from Agouni Gueghrane
21st-century Algerian people